The Phoenix Mercury women's basketball team played in the 2015 season of the WNBA.

Transactions

WNBA Draft

Trades

Schedule
MERCURY: Mercury Schedule 2015

Preseason

Playoffs

Statistics

Regular season

Awards and honors

References

External links
The Official Site of the Phoenix Mercury

Phoenix Mercury seasons
Phoenix
Phoenix Mercury